Thermoplastic vulcanizates (TPV) are dynamically vulcanized alloys consisting mostly of fully cured EPDM rubber particles encapsulated in a polypropylene (PP) matrix. They are part of the thermoplastic elastomer (TPE) family of polymers but are closest in elastomeric properties to EPDM thermoset rubber, combining the characteristics of vulcanized rubber with the processing properties of thermoplastics. There are almost 100 grades in the S portfolio that are used globally in the automotive, household appliance, electrical, construction, and healthcare markets. The name Santoprene was trademarked in 1977 by Monsanto, and the trademark is now owned by Celanese. Similar material is available from Elastron and others.

Overview

TPV was created after several years of research and development aimed at finding new materials for injection-molded tires. Although the search for a new tire material was unsuccessful, it resulted in the development of TPV, which combines the characteristics of vulcanized rubber with the processing properties of thermoplastics. The first sales of developmental products began in 1977, the same year it was registered by Monsanto, and it was fully commercialized in 1981.

Part of the TPE family of polymers, TPV is the closest in elastomeric properties to EPDM thermoset rubber. TPVs have a combination of elastomeric properties, like compression and tension sets, coupled with aging performance and chemical resistance.

Early successes
Santoprene TPV had early application successes in the automotive sector, including rack and pinion boots, due to its flex life, fluid resistance, and sealability. In the appliance sector, a dishwasher sump boot made with Santoprene TPV provided good sealing and resistance to heat and fluids. Due to its sealing properties, Santoprene TPV was also successful in the domestic and high-rise construction sectors in applications such as window seals, caster wheels, tubing, and small hose parts, electrical connectors, and coatings for wire and cables. It was also used in the medical industry as a gasket on syringe plungers.

Chemistry

Santoprene TPV is a dynamically vulcanized alloy consisting mostly of fully cured EPDM rubber particles encapsulated in a polypropylene (PP) matrix.

Photographs made using an atomic force microscope and a scanning electron microscope show a multitude of very small particles, typically no bigger than a couple of microns in diameter. These particles are fully vulcanized rubber (typically EPDM rubber for most Santoprene TPV grades) in a thermoplastic phase (most often PP in the case of Santoprene TPV grades). Fully cross-linked or vulcanized means 98% or above, and because the morphology is "locked-in," it provides stable physical properties.

Properties

Designed for specific engineered applications, Santoprene TPV grades range from the hardness of 35 Shore A up to 50 Shore D.

Santoprene TPV grades offer the following: 
 sealing performance: long-term aging durability combined with dimensional stability and physical properties over the life of the part;
 aesthetics: aspect harmonization between parts and comfort touch interior skins;
 processing: processability on standard thermoplastics processing equipment;
 design flexibility: suitability for coextrusion (coprocessing: molding, extrusion, blow molding) with other polymers for multipart system designs;
 weight reduction: lower density, part design optimization, and material replacement;
 recycling: fully recyclable within the manufacturing process.

Applications

Santoprene TPV grades are designed for a broad range of specific engineered applications.

Automotive components
Santoprene TPV (thermoplastic vulcanization) is used in weather seals, underhood and under-car applications, and interior components. In weather seals, TPV is used as a lightweight alternative to thermoset rubber materials in semi-dynamic and static parts, while in underhood and under-car applications it is well-suited for air ducts, tubing, molded seals, grommets, suspension bellows, cable jacketing, plugs, bumpers, and many other parts. This is due to its sealing performance and resistance to extreme temperatures, chemical exposure, and harsh environments.

Building and construction products
In commercial glazing seals, Santoprene TPV is used for curtain walls, storefronts, architectural windows, and skylight weather seal applications. It is also commonly used in residential glazing seals due to its low air and water infiltration ratings for the life of window and door systems.

For road and rail construction projects, Santoprene TPV is used for bridge and parking decks, water stops, rail pads, and other applications.

In plumbing, Santoprene TPV is used to create long-term seals, gaskets, and grommets that are resistant to flex fatigue, harsh temperatures, and chemicals. It can be used in a variety of sealing applications including pipe seals, bridge expansion joints and curtain walls, parts for potable water, and pipe seals for sewer and drainage.

Household appliance parts
Santoprene TPV is used in washing machines, dryers, dishwashers, refrigerators, small appliances, and floor care. Its properties enable it to be used in a range of parts including pump seals, hoses, couplings, vibration dampeners, drum rollers, knobs, and controls.

Electrical components
Santoprene TPV is used in wiring connectors to make watertight seals with electrical and thermal resistance; insulation for high voltage applications; and flexibility even at low temperatures to −60 °C.

It is used in industrial wire and cable connectors and low-voltage industrial cable applications that include insulation and jackets, in addition to consumer wire and cable use.

For electrical components, Santoprene TPV can be used for watertight seals, enabling connectors to be insert-molded to cable jacketing, producing a single integral part.

Processing
Santoprene TPV can be processed using conventional thermoplastic processes such as injection molding, blow molding , and extrusion. Manufacturing a part using Santoprene TPV, in contrast to rubber, is less complex. Santoprene TPV is ready to use and does not need to be compounded with different ingredients such as reinforcing fillers (carbon black, mineral fillers), stabilizers, plasticizing oils, and curing systems

Compared to processing rubber, thermoplastic processing of Santoprene TPV can deliver shorter cycle times, a higher part output per hour, and the reuse of scrap produced during processing. This can result in part cost reduction, less tooling/machinery, lower scrap costs, and optimization of material logistic costs compared to rubber.

After a short drying period, TPV pellets are automatically transferred to the molding machine or extrusion line. Cycle times can be much faster because the parts do not have to cure in the mold, which is typically two to three minutes for rubber. The TPV part only has to cool, typically about 30 seconds, and then it can be removed from the mold or cooled in water.

Processing options
Injection molding: Santoprene TPV grades can be processed using conventional thermoplastics injection-molding equipment at reduced cycle times compared to thermoset rubber. TPV flexibility allows for greater freedom of mold design where undercuts are employed.

Insert molding: Insert molding consists of placing a preformed substrate into the mold and injecting TPV around or over it. If the insert and the TPV are compatible materials, a melt bond occurs at the interface between the two materials. The strength of this bond is affected by several factors, including interface temperature, cleanliness of the insert, and melt temperature of the TPV.

Two-shot injection molding: TPV can be combined with polymers through several types of multi-shot injection molding processes. By combining multiple materials, a wide variety of parts applications, such as a hard/soft combination, can be achieved. The process produces both a finished part and a substrate during each cycle. Two-shot molding is more efficient than insert molding because no handling of the substrate is required.

Blow molding: Santoprene TPV can be blow molded in a single layer, multi-layer, exchange blow, sequential 3D, suction blow, flashless extrusion blow, injection blow, and press-blow molding processes.

Extrusion: Santoprene TPV is easy to extrude into single and complex profiles. These materials can also be coextruded to yield a part with both rigid and soft components.

Thermoforming: The thermoforming properties of Santoprene TPV are similar to acrylonitrile butadiene styrene (ABS) and exhibit good melt strength, which provides uniform and predictable sag characteristics during heating. When producing a sheet for thermoformed parts, key attributes of Santoprene TPV are maintained, including colorability, impact resistance, weatherability, chemical resistance, non-skid, and matte surface in appearance and feel.

Recycling

Santoprene TPV can contribute to a reduction in overall waste in the manufacturing process as scrap produced during processing can be recycled. Material that has been recycled – even from old parts – exhibits properties almost as good as virgin material as an article in “Design News” magazine reported on May 5, 2003.

According to the article:  
 The results of tests on protective boots for an automotive rack and pinion gears showed that older TPV has slightly lower physical and mechanical properties than new material. Yet some of the key indicators of the material's ability to hold up in this dynamic application did not change significantly. For example, the new and old TPVs had nearly the same properties after air and oil aging. The compression set also remained virtually identical.
 The results of tests that measured the color shift (Delta E) between the exterior and interior surfaces of old and new automotive secondary roof profiles showed that the TPV material experienced insignificant color changes. Other tests, which looked at whether the surfaces of the profiles bore the marks of radiation-induced degradation, showed the material surface appears homogeneous.
 In tests that compared old and new automotive glass run channel profiles, there was no significant difference in the tensile stress-strain properties—a key indicator of sealing performance.

References

External links
 Santoprene Chemical Resistance at VP-scientific.com
 ExxonMobil Santoprene thermoplastic vulcanization (TPV)
 AMCO Polymers, North American Distributor for Santoprene TPV Materials 

Polymers